Fast Food Mania is an American television series that airs in the United States on Destination America. The series premiered on June 3, 2012. Recently it is being aired in TLC India in India.

Premise
The series features its host, Jon Hein, traveling around the United States and visiting various fast food restaurants. Hein discusses the history of the restaurants, along with how their food is prepared. For example, Hein may visit the cities of a restaurant's origin (such as Corbin, Kentucky for Kentucky Fried Chicken), or the restaurant's headquarters (such as Taco Bell headquarters in Irvine, California).

Episodes

References

2012 American television series debuts
Fast food
English-language television shows